Huntingtons are a punk band from Baltimore, Maryland which formed in 1993 in the Maryland and Delaware area by Cliff Powell (a.k.a. Cliffy Huntington), Mike Holt (a.k.a. Mikey Huntington) and Mike Pierce (a.k.a. Mikee Huntington). The band is heavily influenced by the Ramones.

Background 

Huntingtons debut album, Sweet Sixteen, was released in 1996 by Flying Tart Records. A few months later, their first attempt at recording Ramones covers, entitled Rocket to Ramonia saw limited release via the Burnt Toast Vinyl label. At this point the band added a second guitarist, Tom Rehbein (later in Small Towns Burn a Little Slower). After working with producer Mass Giorgini for the band's next album, Fun and Games, Tom was replaced by Brad Ber. After the album's release in mid-1997, the band started touring and gained a cult following. Their big break came in 1998, when they signed to Tooth & Nail Records and released High School Rock.

After touring for the High School Rock release, the band made a conscious decision to take their Ramones sound to the extreme and released five albums in a one-year period. Live: The Good, the Bad and the Ugly, File Under Ramones and Get Lost all made it into stores before 1999 was over. The band also played the first of what would become two shows as Joey Ramone's backing band at CBGB's in NYC. Plastic Surgery and Split were both released to stores in January 2000. During this period the band went through multiple line-up changes before finally settling in for good with Josh Blackway (a.k.a. Jonny Huntington) on second guitar. Josh Zimmer (a.k.a. Danny No. 2) came in on drums and the band spent the remainder of 2000 on the road touring throughout the US and Europe.

In early 2001, Rock 'N' Roll Habits for the New Wave, a collection of newly recorded versions of selected songs from the band's pre-Tooth&Nail era, was released. Upon completion of this record, Josh Zimmer left the band and original drummer, Mikee, came back to help the band with their next record, Songs in the Key of You, which was released in mid-2001.

Cliffy left the band just before the release of the Songs in the Key of You record and after a short break, the band regrouped with a new guitarist (Andy Dibiaso) and drummer (Rick Wise). They toured extensively in the US, Canada and made their second trip to Europe 2002.

2003 brought two more releases from the band: a split EP, The Soothing Sounds of..., and their final full-length of all new original material, Self-Titled Album.

The band ended their 10-year run in 2005 with a 30-song best-of disc, Growing Up Is No Fun: The Standards '95-'05, and played its final show at the Cornerstone Festival, bringing back Cliffy on guitar.

Two years after the band decided to quit, they reunited for a show in Elkton, Maryland and subsequently decided to keep the band going in part-time "do what we want, when we want" status. In 2009, the band released Punk Sounds, which included b-sides, rarities and two new tracks. Official remasters of several of their albums have also been released.  Limited edition vinyl pressings of Sweet Sixteen and Fun and Games were released in mid-2011. A complete collection of the band's demos was released in early 2015 as Prime Times: The Tascam Tapes.

Since 2015, the band has been playing with the lineup of Mike Holt, Jonathan Cliff Walker, Josh Blackway and drummer Chris Eller. Blackway and Eller also tour with C. J. Ramone of the Ramones.

In 2020, the band released ¡Muerto, Cárcel o Rocanrol!, their first full length album of original songs since their self titled album.

Members

Current
Mike Holt ("Mikey"): bass guitar, lead vocals (1993–present)
Cliff Powell ("Cliffy"): guitar, backing vocals (1993–2001, 2005–present)
Josh Blackway ("Jonny"): guitar, backing vocals (1999–present)
Chris Eller: drums (2015–present)

Former
Mike Pierce ("Mikee"): drums (1994–2001, 2009)
Tom Rehbein ("Tommy"): guitar (1996–1997)
Brad Ber ("Bradley"): guitar (1997–1998)
Adam Garbinski ("A. Jay"): guitar (1998–1999)
Justin Garbinski ("Danny #1"): drums (1998–1999)
David Petersen ("Davey"): drums (1999)
Chad Prather ("C.J."): guitar (1999)
Josh Zimmer ("Danny #2"): drums (1999–2001)
Matt Kirkley ("Marty"): bass guitar, lead vocals (2000)
JR Smith: drums (2001)
Rick Wise: drums (2001–2005, 2007–2015)
Andy Dibiaso: guitar, backing vocals (2001–2002 + 1 show on 9/17/15)
Tom Giachero: guitar, backing vocals (2003–2004)

Discography

Studio albums
 Sweet Sixteen (1996)
 Rocket to Ramonia (1996)
 Fun and Games (1997)
 High School Rock (1998)
 File Under Ramones (1999)
 Get Lost (1999)
 Plastic Surgery (2000)
 Rock 'n' Roll Habits for the New Wave (2001)
 Songs in the Key of You (2001)
 Self-titled Album (2003)
 Pull the Plug (2005)
 Rock and Roll Radio (2016)
 Muerto, Carcel, O Rocanrol! (2020)
 Back to Ramonia (2021)

Split albums
 Live at Drexel U (1996)
 Split (2000)
 The Soothing Sounds of... (2003)

Compilations
 Big Hits And Nasty Cuts (1996/2001)
 All the Stuff (And More)-Vol 1 (1998)
 Growing Up Is No Fun: The Standards '95–'05 (2005)
 Punk Sounds (2009)
 1-2-3-4!: The Complete Early Years Remastered (2010)
 Prime Times: The Tascam Tapes (2015)

Live albums
 Live: The Good, the Bad and the Ugly (1999)
 Live at CBGB's (7-inch) (2021)

EPs
 The Only One (1997)

References

External links
Mikey Huntington's year by year history of the band
[ All Music Guide, The Definitive Guide To Popular Music]
PunkMusic.org

HUNTINGTONS official Facebook page

American punk rock groups
Tooth & Nail Records artists